The Inyo Mountains salamander (Batrachoseps campi) is a species of salamander in the family Plethodontidae that is endemic to California in the western United States.

Distribution
It's specifically endemic to the Inyo Mountains and limited to about 5 known localities, located in Inyo County of eastern California. Batrachoseps campi eats small insects.

Conservation
The Inyo Mountains salamander was listed an IUCN Red List endangered species in 1996, being threatened by habitat loss in size and quality, and a declining number of mature individuals. Its status was updated to near threatened in 2022.  The mountains have protected lands in the Inyo Mountains Wilderness Area administered by the Bureau of Land Management, and in the Inyo National Forest.

References

External links
 IUCN - homepage–species status searchengine

Slender salamanders
Salamander
Salamander
Fauna of the Great Basin
Fauna of the Mojave Desert
Natural history of Inyo County, California
Inyo Mountains
Inyo National Forest
Endangered fauna of California
Taxonomy articles created by Polbot
Amphibians described in 1979